Hristo Fliev (born 26 January 1964) is a Bulgarian former wrestler. He competed in the men's Greco-Roman 52 kg at the 1988 Summer Olympics.

References

External links
 

1964 births
Living people
Bulgarian male sport wrestlers
Olympic wrestlers of Bulgaria
Wrestlers at the 1988 Summer Olympics
People from Dimitrovgrad, Bulgaria
Sportspeople from Haskovo Province